Mujtaba Hussain (15 July 193627 May 2020) was an Indian satirist and writer of Urdu literature.

Early life 
Hussain was born on 15 July 1936 in Hyderabad. His brother Ibrahim Jalees was also a humorist, who had moved to Pakistan after the partition of India.

Career
Hussain published several books and over 15 volumes of humor journalism, with many of them translated into Hindi, English and other languages. Apne Yaad Mein, an autobiographical satire, Urdu ke sheher urdu ke log, Behar hal, Safar lakht lakht and Mera Column are some of his notable works. The account of his life has been published as a book by Educational Publishing House, New Delhi, titled Mujtaba hussain jaisa dekha jaisa paya, and they have also published another book, Mujtaba Hussain Ainon ke Beech, on his writing and creations. The Siasat Daily, an Urdu-language Indian daily, has launched a dedicated website on Hussain, where 25 books totaling over 6500 pages of his writings are available for reading.

Awards and recognition
In 2007, the Government of India awarded him the Padma Shri, its fourth highest civilian honour, for his contributions to Urdu literature. 

In 2019, he returned the Padma Shri award citing the atmosphere of hate and protests across the country in the wake of the India's newly amended Citizenship Law.

Death 
Hussain died in Hyderabad on 27 May 2020.

See also 

 Urdu literature

References

External links 
 

Recipients of the Padma Shri in literature & education
People from Hyderabad district, India
Indian satirists
Urdu-language writers from India
Indian humorists
1936 births
Writers from Hyderabad, India
20th-century Indian essayists
Urdu-language humorists
2020 deaths
Indian activists